The women's double sculls rowing competition at the 1980 Summer Olympics took place at Krylatskoye Sports Complex Canoeing and Rowing Basin, Moscow, Soviet Union. The event was held from 21 to 26 July.

Heats 
Winner of each heat advanced to final. The remaining teams must compete in repechage for the remaining spots in the final.

Heat One

Heat Two

Repechage

Finals

References

Sources

Rowing at the 1980 Summer Olympics
Women's rowing at the 1980 Summer Olympics